Simcha Bunim Cohen is an Orthodox rabbi and author who has written English-language halachic works that deal with the intricate laws of Shabbat and Jewish holidays.

Biography
Simcha Bunim was born in 1957 to Rivkah and Moshe Cohen. His grandfather Mr Cohen died in 1958, and his grandmother passed away in 1973.

Rabbi Simcha Bunim Cohen is a senior kollel fellow at Beth Medrash Govoha and lives with his wife and children in Lakewood Township, New Jersey.  He serves as the rabbi for Khal Ateres Yeshaya. He is a grandson-in-law of Rabbi Avigdor Miller.

Works
Cohen authors his books for those fluent primarily in English.  His works on the laws of Shabbat cover their topics in depth and include extensive footnoting and sourcing in Hebrew on the bottom of each page and are "clear, easy to use and authoritative":
 The Shabbos Kitchen: A comprehensive halachic guide to the preparation of food and other kitchen activities on Shabbos
 The Shabbos Home (vol I and II): A comprehensive halachic guide to the preparation of food and other kitchen activities on Shabbos
 The Sanctity of Shabbos: A comprehensive guide to the laws of Shabbos and Yom Tov as they apply to a non-Jew doing work on behalf of a Jew
 The Radiance of Shabbos: The complete laws of the Shabbos and Festival candle lighting, Kiddush, Lechem Mishneh, meals, Bircas Hamazon, and Havdalah
 The Laws of Yom Tov: A comprehensive halachic guide to the laws and practices of the Festivals
 Muktzeh, A Practical Guide: A comprehensive treatment of the principles and common applications of the laws of muktzeh
 Laws of Daily Living: A comprehensive halachic guide to Morning Routines, Preparations for Prayers, Tallis, Tefillin, The Berachos, Amen, Pesukei Dezimrah
 Laws of the Three Weeks, Tishah B'Av and other Fasts (Part of Laws of Daily Living series)
 Children in Halacha: Laws relating to young children: Chinuch, Shabbos, Kashrus, Learning and much more
 The Laws of Aveilus: A comprehensive and practical guide to the laws of mourning

Because his texts make it easy for those with a limited grasp of Hebrew vocabulary, they appear on numerous "must-read" lists for converts and ba'alei teshuva.

References

1957 births
Living people
American Haredi rabbis
Jewish American writers
Rabbis from New Jersey
People from Lakewood Township, New Jersey
21st-century American Jews